Radio Okapi is a radio network that operates in the Democratic Republic of the Congo.  On an annual budget of USD$4.5 million, a staff of 200 provide news and information to the entire urban population of the DRC. Radio Okapi provides programming in French and in the four national languages of Congo: Lingala, Kituba, Swahili and Tshiluba,

History
Radio Okapi was created by the United Nations Mission in the Democratic Republic of Congo (MONUC) and the Swiss NGO Fondation Hirondelle. The agreement between MONUC and the Congolese government foresaw the creation of a radio network to inform the Congolese population of the MONUC's efforts. MONUC and the Fondation Hirondelle submitted a plan in 2001 to the United Nations, and the radio network went live on 25 February 2002. The station takes its name from the endangered Okapi, the elusive mammal native to the rainforest of northern Congo.

In 2011 The Economist said that Radio Okapi was "one of Africa’s most admirably independent radio services".

Mary Myers, in the essay "Well-Informed Journalists Make Well-Informed Citizens: Coverage of Governance Issues in the Democratic Republic of Congo," said that the radio station "raised the bar for other indigenous radio and TV stations in the country." Other area radio stations copied Radio Okapi's news gathering techniques, program concepts, and formats. Myers also said "Although Radio Okapi can be a thorn in the government's side at times, its stance of promoting peace and democracy and the strong role it plays in civic education have led to its recognition, even by the Minister of Information, as a national asset that the Democratic Republic of Congo could ill afford to lose."

Serge Maheshe a journalist for Radio Okapi was shot on 13 June 2007. Maheshe was the editor in chief in Bukavu for the station.

Transmitters
Radio Okapi provides programming in French and in Lingala, Kituba, Swahili and Tshiluba, transmitting all day every day on:

Kinshasa 103.5 MHz
Aru 88.0 MHz
Bandundu 99.0 MHz
Baraka 103.4 MHz
Béni 92.0 MHz
Bukavu 95.3 MHz
Bunia 104.9 MHz
Bunyakiri 103.2 MHz
Butembo 92.9 MHz
Dungu 103.4 MHz
Gbadolite 93.0 MHz
Gemena 95.4 MHz
Goma 105.2 MHz
Isiro 90.1 MHz
Kalemie 105.0 MHz
Kamina 104.3 MHz
Kananga 93.0 MHz
Kanyabayonga 96.0 MHz
Kikwit 103.5 MHz
Kindu 103.0 MHz
Kisangani 94.8 MHz
Lisala 104.3 MHz
Lubumbashi 95.8 MHz
Mahagi 96.0 MHz
Manono 104.5 MHz
Masisi 96.0 MHz
Matadi 102.0 MHz
Mbandaka 103.0 MHz
Mbuji-Mayi 103.5 MHz
Moba 102.4 MHz
Rutshuru 95.3 MHz
Tshomo Uni 106.5 MHz
Uvira 105.3 MHz
Walikale 104.9 MHz

 Shortwave
9635 kHz (5 AM to 7 AM)
11690 kHz (5 PM to 6 PM)

Sources

In film 
 Radio Okapi, radio de la vie, is a documentary produced by Pierre Guyot, 2006.  It premiered on TV5 in June 2006. It examines the work of Breuil Munganga, a journalist at Radio Okapi. It has been selected by many festivals in France, Canada, Central African Republic and Burkina Faso.

See also

 Radios en République démocratique du Congo

References

External links
 Official Site of Radio Okapi 
 Radio Okapi on the MONUC site 
 Article at DXing.info

External links

Okapi
Radio in the Democratic Republic of the Congo
2002 establishments in the Democratic Republic of the Congo